The Prize of the Ecumenical Jury is an independent film award for feature length films shown at major international film festivals since 1973. The award was created by Christian film makers, film critics and other film professionals. The objective of the award is to "honour works of artistic quality which witnesses to the power of film to reveal the mysterious depths of human beings through what concerns them, their hurts and failings as well as their hopes." The ecumenical jury can be composed out of 8, 6, 5, 4 or 3 members, who are nominated by SIGNIS for the Catholics and Interfilm for the Protestants. SIGNIS and Interfilm appoint ecumenical juries at various international film festivals, including Cannes Film Festival (where The Ecumenical Jury is one of three juries at the film festival, along with the official jury and the FIPRESCI jury), Berlin International Film Festival, Locarno International Film Festival, Montreal World Film Festival and the Karlovy Vary International Film Festival.

Winners

Cannes (since 1974) 
Films from diverse countries have won the Prize of the Ecumenical Jury at the Cannes Film Festival. Most films having won the award are from European countries, with Italy, Germany and Poland dominating. Andrei Tarkovsky is the only director to have won three times. Samira Makhmalbaf was the first woman to win the award (followed by Naomi Kawase and Nadine Labaki). Samira's father Mohsen Makhmalbaf was the first director from a predominantly Muslim country. Countries that are not predominantly Christian that have won the award are Japan and the People's Republic of China. In 1998 a special award was given to Ingmar Bergman at Cannes film festival for his whole body of work.

Berlin (since 1992)

Montréal (since 1979)

Locarno (since 1973)

Karlovy Vary (since 1994)

References
General
 
 

Specific

External links 
 Official webpage of the jury
 Official webpage of the Cannes Film Festival
 SIGNIS
 Interfilm

Ecumenical Jury
Ecumenical Jury
Ecumenical Jury
Ecumenical Jury
Awards established in 1973